Parsora is a town in Kendujhar District, Odisha, India.

Geography

Location
National Highway 215 passes through Parsora. Nearest airport is Biju Patnaik Airport at Bhubaneswar.

References

External links
 Satellite map of Parsora
 Map of Parsora

Villages in Kendujhar district